The Krauss-Maffei ML 500 C industrial and works locomotive was built between 1954 and 1966 by Krauss-Maffei.

When the Wilhelmsburg Industrial Railway (Wilhelmsburger Industriebahn) was taken in 1962 two units ended up in the Deutsche Bundesbahn fleet and were incorporated in it as DB Class V 50. Because there were sufficient Class V 60 locomotives available at that time, the two 'loners' were sold in 1964.

No. V 50 001 joined the Verden-Walsrode Railway Company, which re-sold it in 1983 to the track construction firm of  NEWAG. In 1995 it was bought by the Scheufelen Oberlenningen paper factory. In 2003 the Württemberg  Private Railway Museum at Nürtingen (WPN) took over the former works engine. It is now stationed at Neuffen and is operated by the  Railway Vehicle Preservation Company (Gesellschaft zur Erhaltung von Schienenfahrzeugen) or GES.

See also 
 Deutsche Bundesbahn
 List of DB locomotives and railbuses

External links 
The Class ML 500 C at rangierdiesel.de

Deutsche Bundesbahn locomotives
Krauss-Maffei locomotives
C locomotives
Railway locomotives introduced in 1954
Standard gauge locomotives of Germany
Diesel-hydraulic locomotives of Germany
Shunting locomotives